Kamarajar Adithanar Kazhagam, is a political party for Nadars, in the Indian state of Tamil Nadu, formed to represent the interests of the Nadar caste. The party was founded on 3 November 1996, by Selvin. The present party president is SSS Singh Nadar. The party struggles and works for equality among all castes of people, and also fights for protecting the Nadar caste businessmen from other caste rowdies in Tamilnadu. The 26th of March of every year is practised as black day by the Nadar Caste and a big rally is organised in Tirunelveli to remember Selvin.

Political parties in Tamil Nadu
Political parties with year of establishment missing